This page shows the progress of Rotherham United F.C. in the 2010–11 football season, where they play in League Two in the English league system.

Squad

League Two

League table

Result summary

Result round by round

Results

FA Cup

League Cup

Johnstone's Paint Trophy

Appearances and goals
As of 6 May 2011.
(Substitute appearances in brackets)

Awards

Transfers

In

Out

Loaned In

Loaned Out

References

Rotherham United
Rotherham United F.C. seasons